Tres Pinos (Spanish for "Three Pines") is a census-designated place in San Benito County, California. The community lies along State Route 25, approximately 4 miles south of Hollister and 5 miles north of Paicines. The 2010 United States census reported Tres Pinos's population was 476.

Community details
Tres Pinos is in the (831) area code. The local prefix is 628-####.

The Zip Code is 95075. There is no residential postal delivery and residents must use post office boxes for mail delivery.

Tres Pinos Elementary School, a K-8 school, is operated by Tres Pinos Union Elementary School District. The district is overseen by an elected five-member Board of Trustees.

Water and waste water treatment services are provided to the community by the Tres Pinos County Water District. The district is overseen by an elected five-member Board of Directors.

Hazel Hawkins Memorial Hospital is located in Hollister, just under five miles (8 km) north of the town.

History 

The town of Tres Pinos was originally located 5 miles south of the town of Paicines. The opposite is true today.

The railroad was to build a line to Tres Pinos.  By 1873, Southern Pacific Railroad made it to Paicines and it ran two passenger and two freight trains a day.  So in 1874 the names of the two towns were switched so the railroad could say they built a line all the way to Tres Pinos.

In its heyday the town was not only the end of the railroad line but was also a stage coach stop. There was a Southern Pacific Hotel, rodeo grounds, grain barns, corrals, and many saloons, restaurants and even a brothel.

The "Tres Pinos Tragedy" occurred in 1873 when a robbery featuring eight outlaws including Tiburcio Vásquez went wrong, resulting in three murders. (Note that these events took place in the town now called Paicines.)

Geography
According to the United States Census Bureau, the CDP covers an area of 3.6 square miles (9.3 km), all of it land.

Demographics
The 2010 United States Census reported that Tres Pinos had a population of 476. The racial makeup of Tres Pinos was 390 (81.9%) White, 3 (0.6%) African American, 8 (1.7%) Native American, 6 (1.3%) Asian, 0 (0.0%) Pacific Islander, 57 (12.0%) from other races, and 12 (2.5%) from two or more races. Hispanic or Latino of any race were 112 persons (23.5%).

The Census reported that 476 people (100% of the population) lived in households, 0 (0%) lived in non-institutionalized group quarters, and 0 (0%) were institutionalized.

There were 166 households, out of which 62 (37.3%) had children under the age of 18 living in them, 107 (64.5%) were opposite-sex married couples living together, 12 (7.2%) had a female householder with no husband present, 10 (6.0%) had a male householder with no wife present.  There were 10 (6.0%) unmarried opposite-sex partnerships, and 1 (0.6%) same-sex married couples or partnerships. 24 households (14.5%) were made up of individuals, and 7 (4.2%) had someone living alone who was 65 years of age or older. The average household size was 2.87.  There were 129 families (77.7% of all households); the average family size was 3.19.

The population was spread out, with 115 people (24.2%) under the age of 18, 32 people (6.7%) aged 18 to 24, 96 people (20.2%) aged 25 to 44, 181 people (38.0%) aged 45 to 64, and 52 people (10.9%) who were 65 years of age or older.  The median age was 44.5 years. For every 100 females, there were 107.0 males.  For every 100 females age 18 and over, there were 109.9 males.

The homeowner vacancy rate was 3.0%; the rental vacancy rate was 4.9%.  366 people (76.9% of the population) lived in owner-occupied housing units and 110 people (23.1%) lived in rental housing units.

Fairgrounds 

Bolado Park, located in Tres Pinos, is home to the San Benito County Fair and San Benito County Saddle Horse Show & Rodeo. The Bolado Park Golf Course is operated by a concessionaire. The park and fair are operated by the 33rd District Agricultural Association. The association is overseen by a seven-member board of directors appointed by the governor.

Government
On the county level, the community is represented by Supervisorial District 4.

See also
 Hollister, California
 Paicines, California

References

External links
 1998 hydrology data for area.
 State Dept. of Water Resources info on Tres Piños groundwater basin.
 Caltrans area map.

Census-designated places in San Benito County, California
Census-designated places in California